Marco Antonio Medel de la Fuente (born June 30, 1989) is a Chilean footballer who plays as a midfielder for the Chilean team Magallanes.

Club career
It started in the lower divisions of Audax Italiano which would debut in 2007 when the club was going through a great time having great figures like Carlos Villanueva, Fabian Orellana or Franco Di Santo, among others. Gradually he was taking regularly since his debut coming to play the 2008 Copa Libertadores but would consolidation in 2009.

And as a starter in 2009 and 2010 would be key piece of equipment highlighting twice in the Golden Ball as best player ANFP projection and the ideal team, this will mean reaching Colo-Colo on a loan which would have an irregular pace so I finished this return to his former club.

On his return to Audax Italiano again would be one of the key pieces of equipment, with figure of this for the following seasons but all end abruptly in mid-2014 when he and two other players rescind contract by not cumplírseles respective clauses, 3 after this sign Huachipato as a free player but with the sale of the club to a sporting society handover would fall finally saturating in the Santiago Wanderers.

On September 2, 2021, he moved to Magallanes in the Primera B de Chile after being released from Santiago Wanderers.

International career

He debuted in the Chile Chile national under-20 football team led by Ivo Basay in friendly matches with Argentina and Uruguay before being summoned to the Under-20 2009 South American Championship which took place in Venezuela5 where his team failed to qualify for the world cup category. That same year the Under-21s to dispute the hopes 2009 Toulon Tournament where Chile tournament champion being crowned undisputed owner of that team.

He got his first call up to the senior Chile squad for a friendly against the United States in January 2015 and made his international debut in the match. He was named in the preliminary squad for the 2015 Copa America but was omitted from the final squad.

Honours

Club
Universidad Católica
 Primera División (1): 2015–16 Clausura

Santiago Wanderers
 Primera B (1): 2019
 Copa Chile (1): 2017

International
Chile U21
 Toulon Tournament (1): 2009

References

External links
 
 
 

1989 births
Living people
People from Santiago
People from Santiago Province, Chile
People from Santiago Metropolitan Region
Footballers from Santiago
Chilean footballers
Chile under-20 international footballers
Chile youth international footballers
Chile international footballers
Audax Italiano footballers
Colo-Colo footballers
Santiago Wanderers footballers
Club Deportivo Universidad Católica footballers
O'Higgins F.C. footballers
Magallanes footballers
Deportes Magallanes footballers
Chilean Primera División players
Segunda División Profesional de Chile players
Primera B de Chile players
Association football midfielders